The 2012 Australian Open Wildcard Playoffs and Entries are a group of events and internal selections to choose the 8 men and women wildcard entries for the 2012 Australian Open. Tennis Australia will award eight wildcards for the men's and women's professional singles competitions. Former Australian Grand Slam champions, Pat Rafter and Todd Woodbridge will help to select the four discretionary wildcards in the men's draw. In an agreement with the United States Tennis Association, Tennis Australia will give one man and one woman from the United States a wildcard into the Australian Open.
Tennis Australia also has a similar agreement with the French Tennis Federation. The Australian Open is promoted as "the Grand Slam of Asia/Pacific"; one male and one female player from this geographical area will be awarded a wildcard.  The final wildcard will be awarded to the winner of the Australian Open wildcard playoff, a tournament between Australian players, who do not receive direct entry into the draw. Tennis Australia may also decide to give doubles wildcards to Asian participants, based on need and availability.

Wildcard entries
These are the wildcard qualifiers, from both internal selections and playoffs.

Men's singles

Women's singles

US Playoffs

Men's singles

US Playoffs

Women's singles

Australian Playoffs – Men
The Australian playoffs were run by Tennis Australia, with the top 24 men's Australian players who would not be direct qualifiers, or those already selected for an internal wildcard into the main draw, competing.

Finals

Top half

Bottom half

Australian Playoffs – Women
The Australian playoffs were run by Tennis Australia, with the top 16 women's Australian players who would not be direct qualifiers, or those already selected for an internal wildcard into the main draw, competing.

Finals
The top player in each group moves to the final stage.

Blue group
Standings are determined by: 1. number of wins; 2) In two-players-ties, head-to-head records; 3. in three-players-ties, percentage of sets won, or of games won; 4. steering-committee decision.

Magenta group
Standings are determined by: 1. number of wins; 2) In two-players-ties, head-to-head records; 3. in three-players-ties, percentage of sets won, or of games won; 4. steering-committee decision.

Green group
Standings are determined by: 1. number of wins; 2) In two-players-ties, head-to-head records; 3. in three-players-ties, percentage of sets won, or of games won; 4. steering-committee decision.

Yellow group
Standings are determined by: 1. number of wins; 2) In two-players-ties, head-to-head records; 3. in three-players-ties, percentage of sets won, or of games won; 4. steering-committee decision.

See also

References